Volt UK (officially: Volt United Kingdom) is a pro-European political party in the United Kingdom. It is the British branch of Volt Europa, a political movement that operates on a European level.

History
Volt UK was founded in London on 6 January 2020, with Philipp Gnatzy as its first leader.

2021 Elections 
In the 2021 local elections, the party stood one candidate for election to a local authority, Luis Perdigao in Cubbington & Leek Wootton Ward in Warwickshire. He campaigned in particular for improvements in the transport sector and public transport, in addition to avoiding damage from Brexit.

In London, Volt backed Richard Hewison, Rejoin EU's candidate for mayor, and the two parties stood a joint list for the London-wide Assembly seats. Hewison received 1.1% of the mayoral vote, while the two parties received 49,389 votes (1.91%) for the Assembly and thus did not win a seat.

The party also stood in the Scottish Parliament election on a joint list with Renew Scotland.

2022 
In May 2022, the party contested the Glasgow City Council elections. Volt received 4.1% of the first-preference vote in the Pollokshields ward, falling short of winning one of the four seats.

Ideology and policies
The party supports the 5+1 fundamental challenges (1. Smart state, 2. Economic renaissance, 3. Social equality, 4. Global balance, 5. Citizen empowerment, +1 European reform) defined by Volt Europa. In addition to the pan-European policies of Volt, the British branch has some additional policies including electoral reform, rejoining the EU, action to address climate change, and reform of political campaigns.

Volt Scotland
Volt Scotland is the Scottish branch of Volt UK. It participated in the 2021 Scottish Parliament election with two candidates standing on Renew Scotland's party list. For the Scottish Parliament elections, Volt endorsed a multiple-choice referendum on the issue of Scottish independence like its Renew counterparts. Renew Scotland contested five regions and no constituencies in the election, receiving 493 votes nationwide. The party also stood one candidate at the 2022 Scottish local elections, with their candidate garnering 4.06% of first preference votes in the four-member Pollokshields ward.

Electoral performance

Scottish Parliament 

Renew Scotland contested in five regions and no constituencies in the 2021 Scottish Parliament election.

References

2020 establishments in the United Kingdom
Liberal parties in the United Kingdom
Political parties established in 2020
Pro-European political parties in the United Kingdom
Progressive parties
Social liberal parties
United Kingdom